Bagar may refer to:

 Arpunk, Armenia, also called Bagar
 Bagar, China, in the Tibet Autonomous Region
 Bagar region, the sandy tract of western Haryana, eastern Rajasthan and western Punjab in India
 Bagri language, the language spoken in Bagar region of India
 Bagar, Jhunjhunu, village in Jhunjhunu district, Rajasthan, India
 Bagar, Pauri Garhwal, a village in Uttarakhand, India
 Bagar, also Chaunk, a common word used in India cuisine meaning 'seasoning'
 Bagar, Pokhara, a ward in Pokhara Metropolitan City in Nepal